Adam Kaufman (born May 11, 1974) is an American actor, known for his role in 2002 in the Steven Spielberg science fiction mini-series Taken as Charlie Keys, and as Parker Abrams in the fourth season of The WB supernatural/horror drama Buffy the Vampire Slayer.

Biography
Kaufman's father is Jewish, and his mother is Catholic. He studied drama at Lynchburg College, the Circle in the Square Theatre School, and at the Eugene O'Neill Theater Center's National Theater Institute.

Kaufman met Australian-American actress Poppy Montgomery in 2005 in Mexico while working on the independent psychological thriller film Between. In 2010, they worked together again in the TV movie Lying to Be Perfect. At the time, Montgomery starred as FBI agent Samantha Spade in the CBS mystery drama Without a Trace. From 2007 to 2009, Kaufman had a recurring role in the fifth, sixth and seventh seasons as Brian Donovan, Samantha's love interest. In June 2007, Montgomery announced her pregnancy with Kaufman, which was written into the sixth season. On December 23, 2007, Montgomery gave birth to their son Jackson Phillip Deveraux Montgomery Kaufman in Los Angeles.  It was reported on October 10, 2011 in Life & Style that Kaufman and Montgomery broke up due to the distance between them when working.

Filmography

Film

Television

References

External links

1974 births
20th-century American male actors
21st-century American male actors
American male television actors
Circle in the Square Theatre School alumni
Jewish American male actors
Living people
University of Lynchburg alumni
Male actors from Connecticut
Male actors from Virginia
People from New Canaan, Connecticut
21st-century American Jews